McHenry is a city in Foster County, North Dakota, United States. The population was 64 at the 2020 census. McHenry was founded in 1899.

Geography
McHenry is located at  (47.575845, -98.589541).

Demographics

2010 census
As of the census of 2010, there were 56 people, 31 households, and 20 families residing in the city. The racial makeup of the city was 98.2% White and 1.8% from other races. Hispanic or Latino of any race were 1.8% of the population.

There were 31 households, of which 6.5% had children under the age of 18 living with them, 54.8% were married couples living together, 6.5% had a female householder with no husband present, 3.2% had a male householder with no wife present, and 35.5% were non-families. 29.0% of all households were made up of individuals, and 19.4% had someone living alone who was 65 years of age or older. The average household size was 1.81 and the average family size was 2.10.

The median age in the city was 71.3 years. 5.4% of residents were under the age of 18; 1.8% were between the ages of 18 and 24; 10.7% were from 25 to 44; 17.9% were from 45 to 64; and 64.3% were 65 years of age or older. The gender makeup of the city was 46.4% male and 53.6% female.

2000 census
As of the census of 2000, there were 71 people, 36 households, and 27 families residing in the city. The population density was 276.0 people per square mile (105.4/km2). There were 45 housing units at an average density of 174.9 per square mile (66.8/km2). The racial makeup of the city was 98.59% White, and 1.41% from two or more races. Hispanic or Latino of any race were 1.41% of the population.

There were 36 households, out of which 11.1% had children under the age of 18 living with them, 66.7% were married couples living together, 5.6% had a female householder with no husband present, and 25.0% were non-families. 22.2% of all households were made up of individuals, and 19.4% had someone living alone who was 65 years of age or older. The average household size was 1.97 and the average family size was 2.22.

In the city, the population was spread out, with 8.5% under the age of 18, 4.2% from 18 to 24, 12.7% from 25 to 44, 26.8% from 45 to 64, and 47.9% who were 65 years of age or older. The median age was 64 years. For every 100 females, there were 91.9 males. For every 100 females age 18 and over, there were 85.7 males.

The median income for a household in the city was $26,250, and the median income for a family was $27,813. Males had a median income of $57,917 versus $27,917 for females. The per capita income for the city was $14,702. There were 4.3% of families and 16.7% of the population living below the poverty line, including 100.0% of under eighteens and 5.4% of those over 64.

Climate
This climatic region is typified by large seasonal temperature differences, with warm to hot (and often humid) summers and cold (sometimes severely cold) winters.  According to the Köppen Climate Classification system, McHenry has a humid continental climate, abbreviated "Dfb" on climate maps.

References

External links
 McHenry, North Dakota, 1899-1974 from the Digital Horizons website

Cities in North Dakota
Cities in Foster County, North Dakota
Populated places established in 1899
1899 establishments in North Dakota